Narasimha Chintaman Kelkar (N. C. Kelkar), popularly known as Sahityasamrat Tatyasaheb Kelkar (24 August 1872 – 14 October 1947), was a lawyer from Miraj as well as a dramatist, novelist, short story writer, poet, biographer, critic, historian, writer on philosophical and political themes. He was born in Chitpavan Brahmin family. He was a literary and political figure in Maharashtra, India, and also both editor and trustee of the newspaper Kesari. He served as editor twice when Tilak was imprisoned in 1897 and 1908.

He was associated with Shikshana Prasarak Mandali Pune, an education society in Pune established in 1904. He was also closely associated with Bal Gangadhar Tilak in the Indian independence movement. He had also served as the president of Marathi Granth Sangrahalaya, Thane.

After the death of Tilak in 1920, he became one of the foremost leaders of the Tilak faction in the Congress party. He was elected to the Central Legislative Assembly, the lower house of the Imperial Legislative Council in 1923 and served until 1929. He was president of Akhil Bharatiya Hindu Mahasabha twice at Jabalpur in 1928 and Delhi at 1932.

Literary accomplishments

Play 
 Sarojini (1901)
 Tohi mich ani hahi mich alias Mavardevachi jidgoli (1898)
 Chandragupta (1913)
 Totayache band (1913)
 Krishnarjuna yaddha (1915)
 Sant Bhanudas (1919)
 Pattichi nivad , Jangal main mangal (incomplete)

Novels 
 Andharved  (1928)
 Navalpurcha santhanik (1934),
 Balidan (1937)
 Kokancha por (1942)
 Kavala ani Dhapi, Jagachi rit (1943)

Short stories 
 Moujeche char prahar (1931)
 Kusha vishi ani itar goshti (1950)

Poetry 
 Kavyopahar (1927)
Padyaguchha (1936)
 Gatagoshti :  Autobiographical writing (1939)
 Patravyvahar : supplementary to Gatagoshti (1941)

Biographies 
 Garibaldi : in Marathi (1902), this book ran for five editions, and the last edition was published in 1944. 
 Life and times of Lokamanya Tilak (in English) 
 Maza janmabharcha ek udyag, Lokamanya Tilak yanche charitra Purvardha (1923)
 Landmarks of Lokmanya’s life  (in English) (1924)
 Lokamanya Tilakanche punyasmaran  (1927)
 Lokamanya Tilak yanche charitra Uttarardha Vol. II (1928)
 Lokamanya Tilak yanche charitra Uttarardha Vol. III (1928)
 Ayarlandche rastravir Vol I and II with P V Gadgil  (1930)

History 
 Irelandcha itihas (1909)
 Marathe va Ingraj (1918)
 Itihas vihar (1926)
 French rajyakranti (1937)

Court cases 
 Tilak trial (in English, 1908)
 Contempt of court Case (3rd edition 1924)
 Kesarivaril Khatla (1924)

Philosophy 
 Bharatiya tatvajnan : Keshavsut  (1934)
 Gavaran Gita (1944)
 Sudharana, sukha va sadachar (1945)
 Jnaneshvari Sarvasva (1946)

Political writing 
 Case of Indian Home Rule (1917)
 Tirangi Navamatwad (a book on Marxism/communism)

See also
Responsive Cooperation Party

References 

1872 births
1947 deaths
Mayors of Pune
Savitribai Phule Pune University alumni
Marathi-language writers
Indian independence activists from Maharashtra
Indian Hindus
Hindutva
People from Satara (city)
Members of the Central Legislative Assembly of India
People from Miraj
Hindu Mahasabha politicians
Marathi politicians
Maharashtra politicians
19th-century Indian lawyers
20th-century Indian lawyers
Writers from Pune
Indian political writers
20th-century Indian philosophers
20th-century Indian historians
20th-century Indian biographers
20th-century Indian short story writers
20th-century Indian novelists
20th-century Indian dramatists and playwrights
Scientists from Pune
20th-century Indian politicians
19th-century Indian politicians
Scholars from Maharashtra
Novelists from Maharashtra
Presidents of the Akhil Bharatiya Marathi Sahitya Sammelan